Gus Reyes (born June 27, 1977) is a Mexican musician and composer focused on film scoring.

Reyes began his studies in music at the age of 8. His father, Jesus Gustavo Ramírez Avila (Student of Andrés Segovia 1893–1987) was his first teacher in music.

During his early years Reyes was part of several Sacred Music Choirs, all directed by Phillipe H. Tolón, who was Lead Violín at the Opera Orchestra of Bellas Artes (Mexico) at that time. He became soloist fast, and gave tours for many years.  Later, Reyes began his studies in many important music institutions ending with his application to the "Cardenal Miranda Institute" in 1995, where he was studying music.

Mexican teachers like Xavier Gonzalez Tezcucano, Luis Armando Elias Chain, Philippe H. Tolon, Juan Trigos, Jorge Torres Sáenz, Jaime Uribe, Eduardo Gamboa had been part of his education. Reyes studied majors in Composition, Orchestral and Choral Conducting and Musicology.

While studying, Reyes had the chance to start writing music for low budget films, doing almost 20 of them.  Those films are lost in time, nevertheless he kept writing music for this type of productions almost his entire time in college.

Examples of Reyes's music in Mexican film industry are "Magnicidio" (2002), "El Ultimo Evangelio" (2008), "El Ultimo País Mágico" (2005), "El Secreto" (2010), "The Dark Side of Light" (2014), "El Entrenador" (2014), "El Charro de Toluquilla" (2016).

Reyes has collaborated with Andres Sanchez-Maher in "Mexican Gangster" (2014), “El Charro de Toluquilla” (Tribeca 2016), "I Dream in Another Language" (Audience Award Winner at the Sundance Film Festival 2017), the Documentary Film "Ayotzinapa, El Paso de la Tortuga" (Winner of the Audience and the Press Award at Guadalajara International Film Festival 2018), the Netflix - Univision TV Series "El Chapo", "El Complot Mongol", Amazon Prime Video Series "Falco" and Netflix Original Series "Control Z".

Reyes is known for his orchestral arrangements for bands like "Zoé" in their Latin Grammy award-winning MTV unplugged "Música de Fondo" (2011) and "Dorian" in their album "Diez Años y un Día" (2015).

He was nominated for the IX Jerry Goldsmith Awards for his work on the film "The Dark Side of Light" at the International Film Music Festival, that took place in Cordoba, Spain 2014, and later for the Silver Goddess Manuel Esperón Award for best music for a film at the Pecime Press Awards 2015.

Invited by Bertha Navarro, Reyes has been part of all Mexico City's Film Music Labs since 2010 as a Film Scoring Advisor.

Reyes was selected for the Sundance Institute Film Music Program 2016 that took place at the Skywalker Ranch, Nicasio, California.

Examples of his work with Andrés Sanchez-Maher can be found in "El Complot Mongol", “La Ira o el Seól”, the Story-House & Netflix TV Series "El Chapo" and "Tijuana",  HBO's and Fred Armisen "Los Espookys", and the recent Netflix Original Series "Control Z".

Nominations and awards 

 Winner of the "Best Ibero-american Documentary Film Award" and the "Infinitum Audience Award" at the Guadalajara International Film Festival 2016.
 Winner of the Special Jury Award at the Dock of the Bay Festival of Musical Documentary Films, San Sebastián, Spain
 Winner of "Best Documentary" at the International Film Festival of Mérida, Yucatán 2016
 Best of Fest Selection at Sheffield Doc Fest 2016
 Official Selection at Tribeca Film Festival 2016
 Official Selection at Morelia's International Film Festival 2016
 Official Selection at the Zurich Film Festival 2016
 Honorary Mention at the "Jose Rubirosa Award" by UNAM's Film Archive
 Best Director Honorary Mention at Gasparilla International Film Festival, Tampa Bay, Florida
 Winner of the "Audience Award" in the category of World Drama Cinema at the Sundance Film Festival 2017
 Winner of the "Audience Choice Award" at the St. Paul International Film Festival 2017
 Winner of the "Best Feature Film Award" at the Oslo / Fusion International Film Festival 2017
 Winner of the "Best Screenplay and Best Film Award" at the Huelva Latin American Film Festival 2017
 Winner of the "Audience Award" at the Florida Film Festival 2017
 Winner of the "Best Actor, Best Mexican Feature Fiction and Best Mexican Feature Film Award" at the Guadalajara International Film Festival 2017
 Winner of the "Best Feature Film, Best Screenplay, Best Cinematography, Best Sound, Best Original Score and Best Actor Award" at the Ariel Awards, Mexico 2018
 Winner of the Press Award and the Audience Award at Guadalajara's International Film Festival (FICG) 2018.
 Winner of the 2019 Emmy International Award for Best Non-English Language US Primetime Show.
 Winner of the 2022 Ariel Award for Best Original Score for the Film "Cosas Imposibles".

Filmography

He has composed scores for:
El Guero Estrada (1997) Directed by Gilberto De Anda
El Manco (1997) Directed by Gilberto Trujillo
El Gallo Galindo (1997) Directed by Gilberto De Anda
El Policia Increible (1996) Directed by Eduardo Martínez
El Encuentro (2003) Directed by Christian Rivera
Magnicidio, Complot en Lomas Taurinas (2005) Directed by Miguel Marte
El Ultimo País Mágico (2005) Directed by Demetrio Bilbatúa
Halcones, Terrorismo de Estado (2006) Directed by Carlos Mendoza
Los Dueños de la Democracia (2006) Directed by Carlos Mendoza
Mas que mascotas (TV) (2006) Directed by Fabricio Feduchy
Bichos en el Corazon de la Tierra (TV) (2007) Directed by Fabricio Feduchy
El Ultimo Evangelio (2008) Directed by Juan Carlos Valdivia
Bichos, Atrapados en la Ciudad (TV) (2008) Directed by Fabricio Feduchy
1968, La Conexion Americana (2008) Directed by Carlos Mendoza
El Poder de la Imagen (2008) Directed by Patricia Urias
Entre Siglos, La Fortaleza de Perote (2008) Directed by Coizta Grecko
La Independencia de México (2009) Directed by Patricia Urias
Footprints over Footprints UNESCO presentation Paris, France (2009) Directed by Coizta Grecko
Tepetongo, its voice and people (2009) Directed by Oscar Hernandez
La Vida Sobre Rieles (2009) Directed by Felipe Vázquez Maqueda
1910, De la Estación al Tren (2009) Directed by Felipe Vázquez Maqueda
Ciudadanos o Criminales? (2009) Directed by Mario Viveros
Kebira, El Impacto del Gilf Kebir (Work in progress) (2009) Directed by Felipe Vázquez Maqueda
Naturaleza Espectacular (TV) (2009) Directed by Fabricio Feduchy
Blatt Angelus (2009) Directed by Aracely Santana
Una Guerra Secreta (2009) Directed by Patricia Urias
El Productor (TV) (2010) Collaboration with composer Andres Sanchez-Maher
El Secreto (Formerly called "La Casa de las Sanaciones") (2010) Directed by Gilberto De Anda
Heroes Verdaderos (Additional composer) (2010) Directed by Carlos Kuri
La Soledad y el Olvido (2010) Directed by Coizta Grecko
El Libro Rojo: Especies Amenazadas (TV) (2011) Directed by Fabricio Feduchy
El Ring de la Vida (TV) (2011) Directed by Hugo Carrillo
El Libro Rojo: Especies Amenazadas 2nd Season (TV) (2012) Directed by Fabricio Feduchy
El Lado Oscuro de la Luz (2013) Directed by Hugo Carrillo
Entrenando a mi Papá (2014) Directed by Walter Doehner
Gangster Mexicano (Mexican Gangster) (2014) (Composer of additional music) Directed by J.M. Cravioto
Memoria y Verdad (Remembrance and Truth) (2015) Directed by Carlos Mendoza
Pink (2015) Directed by Francisco del Toro
El Charro de Toluquilla (2016) Directed by José Villalobos
Sueño en otro Idioma'(2016) Directed by Ernesto Contreras
La Ira o el Seól' (2017) Directed by Juan Mora
Ayotzinapa, El Paso de la Tortuga' (2017) Directed by Enrique García Meza, Produced by Bertha Navarro & Guillermo del Toro
Ponzoña' (2018) Documentary Film Produced and Directed by Rodolfo Juárez & Alejandro Alonso
El Chapo' TV Series Produced by Story House & Netflix. (2017)
Complot Mongol' (2018) Directed by Sebastian Del Amo
Falco' TV Series Produced by Dynamo & Red Arrow’s Spiral International & Amazon Prime & Telemundo. (2018)
Torre X Torre' Documentary Film produced by Roberto Garza, Marco A. Alvarez, Vlad Ketkovich & Luis Eduardo Sáenz (2018) 
Tijuana' TV Series Produced by Story House & Netflix. (2018)
Chivas, La Película' Produced by Undergoat Films, CobraFilms, Origen Studio, Semillero Studio & Amaury Vergara. (2018)
Los Espookys' TV Series Produced by HBO, (2019) 
Guadalupe Reyes' (2019) Directed by Salvador Espinosa 
Me case con un Idiota' (2019) Directed by Batan Silva 
Control Z' (2019) Netflix Original Series Directed by Alejandro Lozano
Cosas Imposibles' (2020) Directed by Ernesto Contreras
Control Z Season 2' (2021) Netflix Original Series Directed by Alejandro Lozano
Harina' (2022) Amazon & Comedy Central Original Series Directed by Salvador Espinosa
Control Z Season 3' (2022) Netflix Original Series Directed by Alejandro Lozano
Los Espookys Season 2' (2022) TV Series Produced by HBO 
Adolfo' (2022) Directed by Sofía Auza 

His composition works also include scores for the short films:
Contratiempo (2003) Directed by Mauricio Bidault
Nia (2006) Directed by Francisco X. Rivera
Ita Yuyu (2003) Directed by RAFA devillamagallón
The Other Room (2006) Directed by Acán Coen
El Hombre que no Podía Llorar (2007) Directed by Emilio Aguilar
Revolucion S.A. de C.V. (2008) Directed by Emilio Aguilar
Dejad que los niños (2008) Directed by Alfonso Virues
Zeviathan (2010) Directed by Iker Orozco
Pandemonium Nazi (2012) Directed by Jorge Diez De Bonilla Fuchs
Azul (2012) Directed by Danel Nehmad
Bautizo (2012) Directed by Laurette Flores
Victoria (2015) Directed by Gilbo Jiménez
Y Mañana otra vez (2017) Directed by Gilbo Jiménez
Mamá (2017) Directed by Gilbo Jiménez
Papá (2018) Directed by Gilbo Jiménez

Other works:
Salvador (2008) (As Orchestrator) Directed by Victor Salcido
Nación Apache (2009) (As Orchestrator) Directed by Carlos Muñóz
La Abolición (Choral arrangements) (2010)
Música de Fondo (Zoé MTV Unplugged) (Strings and Brass arrangements)
Nada haces por mí (Juan Carlos Lozano) (2011) (Strings arrangements)
Sofá Project (2011) (Composer and Musical Producer)
El Fantástico Mundo de Juan Oról (2012) (Orchestrator and Music Programming)
Dorian (New upcoming CD release) (2012) (Strings arrangements)
 Gangster Mexicano aka "Mexican Gangster" (2013) (Additional Music and String Arrangements)
 Jirón de Niebla (2014) Directed by Julio Cesar Estrada (Music Editor)
 Diez Años y un Día by Dorian (CD Release) (2015) (Strings Arrangements)

References

External links
 
 
 Gus Reyes on The ASCAP / Sundance Composer Spotlight 2017
 Gus Reyes Interview at Movie Music International
 Gus Reyes at the Sundance Film Music Program 2016
 Gus Reyes Interview at Remezcla
 Gus Reyes on Kronos Records
 Gus Reyes on SoundCloud
 Gus Reyes on Facebook
 The Dark Side of Light Original Motion Picture Soundtrack Review by ReviewGraveyard
 The Dark Side of Light Original Motion Picture Soundtrack at the Top Scores of 2014, Critics Choice
 Falco Original Television Soundtrack Review by John Mansell from Movie Music International

Living people
1977 births